General Sir James Frederick Love  (1789 – 13 January 1866) was a British Army officer who served as Lieutenant Governor of Jersey.

Military career
Love was commissioned into the 52nd Regiment of Foot in 1804 and took part in the retreat to Corunna and the Battle of Bussaco during the Peninsular War. He was wounded at the Battle of Waterloo in 1815 and saved Bristol during the riots of 1831. He was appointed British resident at Zakynthos in 1835, Lieutenant Governor of Jersey in 1852 and General Officer Commanding South-Eastern District in 1856 before becoming Inspector-General of Infantry in 1857.

He was Colonel of the 57th (West Middlesex) Regiment of Foot from 1856 to 1865 and Colonel of 43rd (Monmouthshire) Regiment of Foot from 1865 to his death.

He was promoted general on 10 August 1864.

Family
In 1825 he married Mary Heaviside; they had no children.

References

|-

|-

|-

1789 births
1866 deaths
British Army generals
Knights Grand Cross of the Order of the Bath
Governors of Jersey
52nd Regiment of Foot officers
British Army personnel of the Napoleonic Wars